Sand Hollow is an unincorporated community in Payette and Canyon counties in Idaho, United States, roughly  north-northwest of Caldwell.

Description
Sand Hollow is located along Sand Hollow Creek in Sand Hollow (valley) east of Interstate 84/U.S. Route 30 (I‑84/US 30) Sand Hollow interchange (I‑84 exit 17) along the former routing for US 30.

See also

References

Unincorporated communities in Idaho
Unincorporated communities in Payette County, Idaho
Unincorporated communities in Canyon County, Idaho